Juan Alejo (born 9 January 1984) is a Mexican professional boxer. He challenged for the WBO light flyweight title in 2015 and 2017.

Professional career
Alejo won Mexico's Light Flyweight title with an 11th-round TKO of Jose Guadalupe Martinez on August 20, 2014. He won a ten-round split decision victory over Jose Rivas on May 27, 2015.

On October 10, 2015 he fought the WBO Light Flyweight Champion Donnie Nietes for the title being the contender, Alejo was the WBO #2 Light Flyweight fighter. In the main event at StubHub Center in Carson, California, Nietes, (37-1-4, 21 KOs) beat Alejo, (21-3, 13 KOs), over twelve rounds in a unanimous decision. Scores were 119-109, 119-109, 120-108.

On December 2, 2017 he fought the Puerto Rican Boxer Ángel Acosta for a vacant WBO World Light flyweight title, where he got knocked out at tenth round of the fight. It was one of the attractions of the main even fight of Miguel Cotto vs Sadam Ali, were Miguel Cotto lost by Unanimous Decision.

Professional Record

|-
| style="text-align:center;" colspan="9"|24 wins (14 knockouts), 5 defeats, 1 draw
|-  style="text-align:center; background:#e3e3e3;"
|  style="border-style:none none solid solid; "|No.
|  style="border-style:none none solid solid; "|Res.
|  style="border-style:none none solid solid; "|Record
|  style="border-style:none none solid solid; "|Opponent
|  style="border-style:none none solid solid; "|Type
|  style="border-style:none none solid solid; "|RoundTime
|  style="border-style:none none solid solid; "|Date
|  style="border-style:none none solid solid; "|Location
|
|- align=center
|
|Loss||24–5–1||align=left|  Ángel Acosta
|
|
|
|align=left| Madison Square Garden, New York City, New York, U.S.
|align=left|For vacant WBO light flyweight title

|- align=center
|
|Draw||24–4–1||align=left|  Luis Javier Cerrito
|
|
|
|align=left| Arena El Jefe, Monterrey, Mexico
|align=left|Retained WBC FECOMBOX light flyweight title

|- align=center
|
|Win||24–4||align=left|  Genaro Rios
|
|
|
|align=left| Arena El Jefe, Monterrey, Mexico
|align=left|Retained WBC FECOMBOX light flyweight title

|- align=center
|
|Win||23–4||align=left|  Gabriel Ramirez Anaya
|
|
|
|align=left| Centro de Espectaculos El Jefe, Monterrey, Mexico
|align=left|Retained WBC FECOMBOX light flyweight title

|- align=center
|
|Win||22–4||align=left|  Luis Manuel Macias
|
|
|
|align=left| Centro de Espectaculos El Jefe, Monterrey, Mexico
|align=left|Won WBC FECOMBOX light flyweight title

|- align=center
|
|Win||21–4||align=left|  Ivan Rodriguez
|
|
|
|align=left| Arena El Jefe, Monterrey, Mexico
|align=left|

|- align=center
|
|Loss||20–4||align=left|  Donnie Nietes
|
|
|
|align=left| StubHub Center, Carson, California, U.S.
|align=left|For World Boxing Organization and The Ring light flyweight titles

|- align=center
|
|Win||20–3||align=left|  Jose Rivas
|
|
|
|align=left| Arena El Jefe, Monterrey, Mexico
|align=left|

|- align=center
|
|Win||19–3||align=left|  Jesus Faro
|
|
|
|align=left| Arena El Jefe, Monterrey, Mexico
|align=left|Retained Mexico light flyweight title

|- align=center
|
|Win||18–3||align=left|  Elfego Sierra
|
|
|
|align=left| Arena El Jefe, Monterrey, Mexico
|align=left|

|- align=center
|
|Win||17–3||align=left|  Jose Guadalupe Martinez
|
|
|
|align=left| Arena El Jefe, Monterrey, Mexico
|align=left|Won vacant Mexico light flyweight title

|- align=center
|
|Win||16–3||align=left|  Eduardo Cruz Munoz
|
|
|
|align=left| Arena El Jefe, Monterrey, Mexico
|align=left|

|- align=center
|
|Win||15–3||align=left|  Alberto Arias
|
|
|
|align=left| Centro de Espectaculos El Jefe, Monterrey, Mexico
|align=left|

|- align=center
|
|Win||14–3||align=left|  Miguel Aleman
|
|
|
|align=left| Centro de Espectaculos El Jefe, Monterrey, Mexico
|align=left|

|- align=center
|
|Win||13–3||align=left|  Job Solano
|
|
|
|align=left| Arena Coliseo, Monterrey, Mexico
|align=left|

|- align=center
|
|Win||12–3||align=left|  Erik Ramirez
|
|
|
|align=left| Monterrey, Mexico
|align=left|

|- align=center
|
|Win||11–3||align=left|  Josue Vega
|
|
|
|align=left| Arena Coliseo, Monterrey, Mexico
|align=left|

|- align=center
|
|Win||10–3||align=left|  Leiver Perez
|
|
|
|align=left| Arena Coliseo, Monterrey, Mexico
|align=left|

|- align=center
|
|Win||9–3||align=left|  Sammy Reyes
|
|
|
|align=left| Arena Coliseo, Monterrey, Mexico
|align=left|

|- align=center
|
|Win||8–3||align=left|  Arturo Castro Vazquez
|
|
|
|align=left| Arena Coliseo, Monterrey, Mexico
|align=left|

|- align=center
|
|Win||7–3||align=left|  Reynaldo Avila
|
|
|
|align=left| Auditorio Municipal Milo Martínez de la Rosa, Monclova, Mexico
|align=left|

|- align=center
|
|Win||6–3||align=left|  Jesus Machorro
|
|
|
|align=left| Matehuala, Mexico
|align=left|

|- align=center
|
|Win||5–3||align=left|  Juan de Dios Castro
|
|
|
|align=left| Arena El Jefe, Monterrey, Mexico
|align=left|

|- align=center
|
|Win||4–3||align=left|  Arturo Infante
|
|
|
|align=left| Plaza de Toros, Matehuala, Mexico
|align=left|

|- align=center
|
|Win||3–3||align=left|  Juan de Dios Castro
|
|
|
|align=left| Plaza de Toros, Matehuala, Mexico
|align=left|

|- align=center
|
|Win||2–3||align=left|  Juan de Dios Castro
|
|
|
|align=left| Salón de la Sección 288, Monclova, Mexico
|align=left|

|- align=center
|
|Win||1–3||align=left|  Zenon Penaflor
|
|
|
|align=left| Gimnasio Municipal, Saltillo, Mexico
|align=left|

|- align=center
|
|Loss||0–3||align=left|  Jesus Limones
|
|
|
|align=left| Plaza de Toros Rea, Mazatlán, Mexico
|align=left|

|- align=center
|
|Loss||0–2||align=left|  Jose Cabrera
|
|
|
|align=left| Arena Monterrey, Monterrey, Mexico
|align=left|

|- align=center
|
|Loss||0–1||align=left|  Jesus Limones
|
|
|
|align=left| Plaza de Toros, Nuevo Laredo, Mexico
|align=left|

|-
| style="text-align:center;" colspan="9"|TKO - Technical Knockout,    KO - Knockout,   TD - Technical Decision,   RTD - Referee Technical Decision,   SD - Split Decision,   UD - Unanimous Decision,   D - Draw

References

External links
 

1984 births
Living people
Mexican male boxers
Boxers from Nuevo León
Flyweight boxers
Light-flyweight boxers
People from Guadalupe, Nuevo León